is a UK company law case concerning the circumstances by which a transaction at an undervalue would be considered an unauthorised return of capital.

Facts
Tradegro Ltd, which owned approximately 75% of Progress Properties, agreed to sell its shareholding in Progress to P, who owned the other 25%. It was a condition of that agreement that Tradegro Ltd would make Progress Properties transfer, under a separate sale agreement, its shareholding in YMS Properties Ltd, a subsidiary of the Progress Properties, to the Moorgarth Group Ltd, a subsidiary of Tradegro Ltd. So at the time of the sale of YMS Ltd its vendor and its purchaser were both under the control of T Ltd. Now led by its new management, Progress Properties alleged that the transfer of its shareholding in YMS Ltd to the Moorgarth had been at a gross undervalue and so was ultra vires and unlawful as an unauthorised return of capital. It claimed for return of the shares or compensation. It was accepted, however, that the director, Mr Moore, who procured the sale, acting on behalf of both Progress and Moorgarth, had genuinely believed that the sale was at market value.

The judge held that, even on the assumption that the sale of YMS Ltd had been at an undervalue, it was a genuine sale, not ultra vires and not an unauthorised distribution of Progress' assets. The Court of Appeal dismissed the Progress' appeal and held the sale was an intra vires for a proper purpose even if it had been at an undervalue.

Judgment
The Supreme Court again dismissed the appeal and held that the transaction was sound because even though it was an extremely bad bargain in hindsight, it was negotiated in good faith and at arm's length. The court's task is to inquire into the true purpose and substance of the impugned transaction by investigating all the relevant facts, including the states of mind of the people acting on the company's behalf, though it is always possible that transactions can be unlawful regardless of the directors' state of mind. Accordingly, the transaction was neither ultra vires nor an unlawful reduction of capital. Lord Walker gave the leading judgment.

Lord Mance and Lord Clarke delivered concurring judgments. Lord Phillips and Lord Collins agreed.

See also
UK company law

Notes

References
E Micheler, 'Disguised Returns of Capital – An Arm's Length Approach' [2010] Cambridge Law Journal 151

United Kingdom company case law
2010 in case law
2010 in British law
Supreme Court of the United Kingdom cases